Janice Lough  is a climate scientist at the Australian Institute of Marine Science (AIMS) at James Cook University, researching climate change, and impacts of temperature and elevated  on coral reefs. She was elected to the Australian Academy of Science in 2022 for her research in climate change, coral reefs, and developing high resolution environmental and growth histories from corals, particularly the Great Barrier Reef.

Career 
Lough obtained both her BSc in 1976, and her PhD in 1981 at the University of East Anglia, in the UK. She worked at the University of Arizona, in the Laboratory of Tree-Ring Research, from 1982 to 1986, and subsequently moved to the Australian Institute of Marine Science in 1986.

Lough is a climate scientist who has been working on the growth and environmental records from corals over the past several centuries, and positioning these within a historical context. She also studies how climate changes have impacted tropical marine ecosystems already, as significant warming within tropical oceans has been recorded. She reports on the noticeable impacts of this warming with noticeable and observable consequences for current reefs.

Lough's career focuses on three areas, developing and interpreting reconstructions of paleo-climates, determining the nature, causes and consequences of climate variability on tropical coral reefs, as well as developing coral calcification histories, based upon coral cores. She has expertise in coral growth, calcification, climate change and the Great Barrier Reef. She is a member of the ARC Centre for Excellence for Coral Reef Studies, at James Cook University.

Lough's work has been described by the Carbon Brief, the ABC, New York Times, and Australian Geographic, as well as other media outlets, describing the impact of climate change on coral reefs. She has also published in the media on work on the calcification of changing oceans.

Awards 
 2020 – International Coral Reef Society (ICRS) Fellow award
 2022 – Fellow, Australian Academy of Science

Selected publications

References

External links 
 Ethos
 Oxford Bibliographies
 Australian Academy Fellows

Living people
Australian women academics
Marine biologists
Climatologists
Australian women scientists
Fellows of the Australian Academy of Science
Alumni of the University of East Anglia
Academic staff of James Cook University
Year of birth missing (living people)